Meall an Fhudair (764 m) is a mountain in the Grampian Mountains, Scotland. It lies immediately north of the Arrochar Alps, near to the small village of Inverarnan.

A sprawling and wild mountain, it offers fine views from its summit. Walks usually start from the main A82 road just to the east.

References

Mountains and hills of Argyll and Bute
Marilyns of Scotland
Corbetts
Mountains and hills of the Southern Highlands